Hartington Upper Quarter is a civil parish in the High Peak district of Derbyshire, England. The civil parish was created following the division of the ancient parish of Hartington into four.  The parish had a population of 451 according to the 2001 census reducing to 438 at the 2011 Census.

The parish is long and thin, extending from north-west of Buxton, taking in the Errwood Reservoir, to the south-east, and Ann Croft.  The parish borders parishes in High Peak and Derbyshire Dales districts, and also some parishes in the Staffordshire Moorlands and Cheshire East districts.

See also
Listed buildings in Hartington Upper Quarter

References

Civil parishes in Derbyshire